The Feinstein Institutes for Medical Research in Manhasset, Nassau County, New York, United States, on Long Island, constitute the research arm of Northwell Health. Feinstein is home to 50 research labs, 2,500 clinical research studies, and 5,000 professional and support staff. Feinstein scientists conduct research in molecular medicine, genetics, cancer, brain research, mental health, autoimmunity and bioelectronic medicine, among others. Feinstein is the laboratory and faculty home of the Elmezzi Graduate School of Molecular Medicine. Students without an MD degree may earn a PhD in molecular medicine via the Donald and Barbara Zucker School of Medicine at Hofstra/Northwell, as part of the medical school's MD/PhD or PhD programs.

The Feinstein Institutes acquired assets from the closing of the Picower Institute for Medical Research, founded in 1991 by Anthony Cerami and funded by Jeffry Picower. In 2001 the institute's funding was withdrawn and it closed; in 2002 it was acquired by The Institute for Medical Research at North Shore-LIJ.  In 2005 board member Leonard Feinstein, co-founder of Bed Bath & Beyond, made a $25 million gift that led to its renaming The Feinstein Institute for Medical Research. In 2016, Feinstein and his wife, Susan, committed another $25 million.

In 2019, Feinstein comprised 5 institutes:
 Institute of Bioelectronic Medicine, led by Yousef Al-Abed, PhD.
 Institute of Molecular Medicine, led by Betty Diamond, MD.
 Institute of Cancer Research, led by Richard R. Barakat, MD.
 Institute of Health Innovations & Outcomes Research, led by Thomas McGinn, MD, MPH.
 Institute of Behavioral Science, led by John Kane, MD.

Feinstein publishes two open-access, international peer-reviewed medical journals in partnership with BioMed Central, part of Springer Nature: Molecular Medicine and Bioelectronic Medicine.

The Feinstein Institutes bestow two major academic awards: the Anthony Cerami Award in Translational Medicine, starting in 2013, and the Ross Prize in Molecular Medicine.

Support services and cores

Feinstein has the standard support services and scientific cores to support basic research. Support includes:
 Animal Welfare Office - IACUC & IBC
 Biostatistics Unit
 Center for Comparative Physiology
 Center for Research Informatics & Innovation
 Environmental Health & Safety Office
 Human Research Protection Program
 Office of Clinical Research
 Office of Intellectual Assets Management
 Office of Research Compliance
 Office of Research Policy & Training

The cores include:
 Flow Cytometry Core
 Microscopy Core
 Molecular Biology Core Facility
 Nursing Core
 Quantitative PCR Core Facility

Multimillion dollar fine
In 2016, the Feinstein Institutes for Medical Research agreed to pay the U.S. Department of Health and Human Services, Office for Civil Rights (OCR), $3.9 million to settle potential violations of the Health Insurance Portability and Accountability Act of 1996 (HIPAA) privacy and security rules and to undertake a substantial corrective action plan to bring its operations into compliance.

References

External links
 

Manhasset, New York
Medical research institutes in New York (state)
Non-profit organizations based in New York (state)